This article shows the rosters of all participating teams at the women's field hockey tournament at the 2019 Pan American Games in Lima, Peru. Rosters can have a maximum of 16 athletes.

Age and caps as of 29 July 2019 and clubs for which they played in the 2018–19 season.

Pool A

Argentina
The following 16 players were named in the Argentina squad, which was announced on 11 July 2019.

Head Coach: Carlos Retegui

Reserves:
 Cristina Cosentino (GK)
 Priscila Jardel

Canada
The following 16 players were named in the Canada squad.

Head Coach: Giles Bonnet

Cuba

Uruguay

Pool B

Chile
The following 16 players were named in the Chile squad.

Head Coach: Diego Amoroso

Reserves:
 Mariana Lagos
 Natalia Salvador (GK)

Mexico
The following 16 players were named in the Mexico squad.

Head Coach: Arely Castellanos

Jesús Castillo (GK)
Mireya Bianchi
Mayra Lacheno
Maribel Acosta
Karen González
Cindy Correa
María Correa
Michel Navarro (C)
Jennifer Valdés
Montserrat Inguanzo (GK)
Ana Juárez
Marlet Correa
Arlette Estrada
Fernanda Oviedo
Nathalia Nava
Karen Orozco

Peru
The following 16 players were named in the Peru squad.

Head Coach: Patricio Martínez

Chiara Conetta (GK)
Camila Levaggi
Solange Alonso
Geraldine Quino
Claudia Ardiles
María José Fermi (C)
Marina Montes
Nicole Cueva
Yurandi Quino
Marianella Álvarez
Camila Méndez
Ana Palomino (GK)
María Jiménez
Malen Moccagatta
Victoria Montes
Daniela Ramírez

United States
The following 16 players were named in the United States squad, which was announced on 9 July 2019.

Head Coach: Janneke Schopman

Reserves:
 Alyssa Parker
 Kealsie Robles (GK)

References

Rosters